The General Labour Federation of Belgium (or FGTB; , ABVV) is a socialist national trade union federation in Belgium. It was founded in 1945. It is affiliated with the International Trade Union Confederation and has a membership of 1.5 million. With said membership the ABVV/FGTB is the second largest of the three major trade unions in Belgium, closely following the Confederation of Christian Trade Unions (ACV/CSC) which has 1.6 million members and dwarfing the General Confederation of Liberal Trade Unions of Belgium (ACLVB/CGSLB) which has approximately 300,000 members. During the bulk of its history the ABVV/FGTB remained closely affiliated with the Belgian Socialist Party which was split in 1978 into a Flemish and a Walloon social-democratic party. While remaining formally independent from any political party, the ABVV/FGTB noticed the increasing influence by the marxist Workers' Party of Belgium amongst its active base during the last decade.

History

The first noteworthy historic date when talking about the history of the ABVV/FGTB is the founding of the Belgian Labour Party (BLP) in 1885. While several socialist organisations already existed beforehand this was the first time that the Belgian socialist movement was largely unified and laid the groundwork for the foundation of the ABVV/FGTB. In 1898 the Syndical Commission was erected within the framework of the BLP and in 1937 this Commission formally became independent from the socialist party, as the Belgian Trade Union Federation. Nonetheless strong ties between the socialist union and the socialist party were maintained until today. After the Second World War in 1945 this independent socialist union became the ABVV/FGTB we know today.

Membership and Affiliates

In 2017 the ABVV/FGTB had a total of 1,517,968 members divided across its 7 affiliates. Thus Belgium's second largest labour union noticed a modest decline in membership of 17,340 compared to 2016. On the regional level 726,410 of the aforementioned membership comes from Flanders, 600,945 from Wallonia and 190,613 from Brussels.

Former affiliates

Walloon movement

Through the foundation of the Mouvement populaire wallon during the Great Strike that took place in the Winter 1960-1961, the Walloon working class now also demanded federalism as well as structural reforms. The leader of the Strike, André Renard was also a national leader of the General Labour Federation of Belgium. This whole process will be named Renardism.

Leadership

General Secretaries
1945: Joseph Bondas
1947: Paul Finet
1952: Louis Major
1968: Georges Debunne
1982: Alfred Delourme
1987: Jean Gayetot
1989: Mia De Vits
2002: André Mordant
2004: Xavier Verboven
2006: Anne Demelenne
2014: Marc Goblet
2017: Robert Vertenueil
2018: Miranda Ulens

Presidents
1956: Roger Dekeyzer
1957: Willy Schugens
1958: Alfons Baeyens
1959: Hervé Brouhon
1960: Emiel Janssens
1961: Joseph Dedoyard
1963: Victor Thijs
1964: Oscar Leclercq
1965: Desiré Van Daele
1966: Louis Plumier
1967: Gust Wallaert
1968:
1982: André Vanden Broucke
1989: François Janssens
1995: Michel Nollet
2002: Mia De Vits
2004: André Mordant
2006: Rudy De Leeuw
2018: Robert Vertenueil
2020: Thierry Bodson

See also

References

Sources

External links
  

Trade unions in Belgium
Walloon movement
International Trade Union Confederation
European Trade Union Confederation
Trade Union Advisory Committee to the OECD
1945 establishments in Belgium
National federations of trade unions
Socialism in Belgium
Trade unions established in 1945